Galtymore or Galteemore is a mountain in the province of Munster, Ireland. At , it is one of Ireland's highest mountains, being the 12th-highest on the Arderin list, and 14th-highest on the Vandeleur-Lynam list.  Galtymore has the 4th-highest topographic prominence of any peak in Ireland, which classifies Galtymore as a P600, or "major mountain".  It is one of the 13 Irish Munros.

The mountain is accessed by hillwalkers via the 3–4 hour Black Road Route, but is also summited as part of the longer 5–6 hour Circuit of Glencushnabinnia, and the at least 10–hour east-to-west crossing of the entire range, called the Galtee Crossing, which is climbed annually in the Galtee Challenge.

The mountain and its deep corrie lakes are associated with various Irish folklore tales regarding Saint Patrick and serpents.

Naming

Irish academic Paul Tempan in his Irish Hill and Mountain Names Database (2010), listed "Galtymore" as the name for the peak, and "Galty Mountains" as the name for the range. "Galtymore" is recorded as early as the Civil Survey of Co. Tipperary (Down Survey, 1654–56) as a boundary feature of the barony of Clanwilliam. The peak is named "Galtymore Mountain" on the Ordnance Survey Ireland Discovery Map. The townland on its southern slopes is named Knocknagalty (Cnoc na nGaibhlte).

Some guidebooks and other publications suggest that the name "Galty" or "Galtees" is an anglicisation of Sléibhte na gCoillte (mountains of the forests). The 19th century diarist Amhlaoibh Ó Súilleabháin recorded a different Irish name, Beann na nGaillti, and the names of three nearby places are derived from this: Glencoshnabinnia (P. W. Joyce, Irish Names of Places iii, 366), Slievecoshnabinnia and Carrignabinnia.

The range was historically named Sliabh gCrot (the hump mountains), anglicised as "Slievegrot"; or Crotta Cliach (the humps of Cliú), after the territory of Cliú.

The summit of Galtymore is marked as Dawson's Table, named after the Dawson-Massey family who were large landowners in the area (Tipperary Directory 1889), owning much of the land on and around the north section of the Galty range.

The area also originated Kerry Group's popular bacon food brand Galtee; and the term Galtee Mountains is still in common use.

Geology

The geology of the Galty Mountains is described as being Old Red Sandstone, from the Devonian period, and Silurian shales. Old Red Sandstone is also common in the MacGillycuddy's Reeks mountain range, and as well as having a purple–reddish colour, is also devoid of fossils.

The southern smooth slopes of the Galty range give way to a steep northern face, pocked with deep corries and their accompanying moraine lakes.

Geography

The climbing guidebook writer Paddy Dillion said of the range: "the lofty Galty Mountains have forested flanks; and there is much heather, bogs, and steep slopes, but the effort is worth it and Galtymore is a splendid viewpoint".

This central ridge section includes the highest peaks of Galtymore , Lyracappul , Carrignabinnia , and Slievecushnabinnia . Many of the peaks of the central section have a moderate topographical prominence, which means that the central ridge maintains a reasonably sustained height; an attractive feature for hill walkers.

The 24 peaks of the Galty range with a height above , and include 13 peaks with a height above , and five that are classified as Marilyns – being peaks with a prominence above .  The Galtys are described as Ireland's highest "inland" range.

Galtymore and Galtybeg sit near the middle of the range and their north faces show evidence of glacial erosion with a number of deep corries, most of which are now occupied by loughs. Between Galtymore and Galtybeg lies Lough Diheen, while Lough Curra lies between Galtymore and Slievecushnabinnia.

Galtymore is the 460th-highest mountain, and 12th most prominent mountain, in Britain and Ireland, on the Simms classification. Galtymore is regarded by the Scottish Mountaineering Club (SMC) as one of 34 Furths, which is a mountain above  in elevation, and meeting the other SMC criteria for a Munro (e.g. "sufficient separation"), and which are outside (or furth), of Scotland; this is why Carrauntoohil is also referred to as one of the thirteen Irish Munros. Galtymore's prominence qualifies it as a P600, which classes Galtymore as a "major" mountain in Britain and Ireland.

Hill walking

The most straightforward route to the summit of Galtymore is from the south via the  3–4 hour Black Road Route, which starts at the end of the Black Road car park (accessed from the R639 road near the village of Skeheenarinky), and summits Galtybeg , before the main summit of Galtymore.  It then retraces its route back to the Black Road car park.

The  5–6 hour Circuit of Glencushnabinnia, which follows a loop around Galtymore's deep northern corries at Lough Curra and Lough Dihneen, is described as the "connoisseur's route". It starts at the forest car park near the Clydagh Bridge in the north, and climbs Cush , Galtybeg , Galtymore and Slievecushnabinnia , before returning to the start (it can also be done anti–clockwise).

The annual Galtee Challenge organised by the Galtee Walking Club is the full , over 10-hour, east-to-west crossing of the range (also called the Galtee Crossing), and takes in all major peaks of the Galty Mountains.  The challenge normally starts in Cahir in the east, and finishes in Anglesboro Village, in the west.  Despite the distance, longer than the MacGillycuddy's Reeks Ridge Walk, the 10–hour estimate is reasonable as the variation in elevation is moderate.

List of peaks

The MountainViews Online Database list 24 Galty mountain peaks with an elevation, or height, above .

Summit

Galtymore's summit is described a large concave plateau separated by two peaks.  The plateau consists of Old Red Sandstone and is known as Dawson's Table after the historical landowners, the Dawson-Massey family.  This is similar to Percy's Table on the summit of Lugnaquilla, the highest mountain in County Wicklow and Leinster.  There is a cairn on top of each peak and the eastern one marks the true summit of Galtymore. These twin summits give Galtymore a distinctive profile from a distance.  The summit of Galtymore marks the boundary of Limerick and Tipperary.

In 1975, a  white iron cross was erected on the north edge of Dawson's Table by Tipperary local Ted Kavanagh.  The cross is situated a few metres away from the eastern summit cairn and looks into the glen of Aherlow.  It is kept white by being painted every year.

To the west of the summit of Galtymore lies a  dry stone wall known as the Galtee Wall, that was built in 1878 to separate the Dawson-Massey Estate in the north, from the Galtee Castle Estate in the south.  It is recorded that it took 30–40 men more than 4 years to complete the wall, and that the reason for its construction was to give employment to local small farmers during a period of economic depression (hence why is it also called a famine wall).  The Galtee Wall runs from below the west summit of Galtymore, across the top of Slievecushnabinnia, the top of Carrignabinnia, and on to the summit of Lyracappul, the second-highest peak in the Galtees.

Folklore

The mountains appear in Irish folk tales, and the deep corrie lakes of the Galtys were believed to be enchanted. In early Irish literature, the mountains are called [Sliab] Crotta Cliach (the [mountain] humps of Cliú), which was the name of the surrounding territory. As  can also mean a celtic harp, the name was interpreted as "mountains of Cliach's harps", and there is a tale of a legendary harper called Cliach playing his harps in the mountains to woo an otherworldly woman who lived in the summit cairn on Slievenamon.  After failing, he plays his two harps together, and the hill bursts open and forms a lake. This lake is Lough Muskry, which is named after the Múscraige people that lived in the south of Ireland.

Lake Muskry was formerly known as Loch Béal Séad (lake of the jewel mouth) and also as Loch Béal Dracon (lake of the dragon's mouth). The oldest mention of the name is in the tale entitled Aislinge Óenguso (The Dream of Aengus) which dates from c.750 AD. This states: Mac Og went to Loch Bél Draccon when he saw the 150 white birds at the loch with their silvery chains and golden caps around their heads. The next oldest mention is in the Dindsenchas, composed c.1000. The Metrical Dindsenchas of Crotta Cliach states: At the spot where he died of terror, Cliach sang sweet melody; there seized him there suddenly, not unprotected, the loathly dragon that dwells in this place - Loch Bel Dragon. The Rennes Dindsenchas also relates a further tale of Saint Fursey drowning the dragon in the lake. There is a folk tale of a serpent that was killing livestock on the Galty Mountains being banished by Saint Patrick and confined to Lake Muskry. According to the tale, Saint Patrick chained the serpent under the lake and promised to release the creature on Lá an Luan (the Day of Judgement), which the serpent mistook as An Luain (Monday or Easter Monday).  The serpent comes up each Easter Monday and asks "Is it the Monday morning yet Patrick?" and Patrick says "No", and the serpent goes down again for another year.  The same legend is also associated with Lough Dihneen, below Galtybeg. The belief in the serpent under Lough Dihneen was held so strongly that a Captain Dawson, a local landlord, attempted to drain Lough Dihneen in the 1830s to kill the serpent.

Folk tales attribute the banishing of the serpent by Saint Patrick with the subsequent richness of farming in the area.  In addition to local folklore, Lake Muskry also features in the Irish mythological tale of the Caer Ibormeith.

1976 air crash

On 20 September 1976, three airmen: Tom Gannon, Jimmy Byrne and Dick O'Reilly from Abbeyshrule, were killed when their plane crashed not far from O'Loughlin's Castle, a rock–formation near Greenane West, on the Galtys. The three were founding members of Abbyshrule Air Club. A stone monument in the shape of a plane's tailfin was erected a short distance into the Black Road Route on the path to Knockeenatoung.  The crash led to the founding of the South Eastern Mountain Rescue Association (SEMRA) in 1977.  The event was remembered on its 40th anniversary by SEMRA in September 2016.

See also

Lists of mountains in Ireland
List of mountains of the British Isles by height
List of P600 mountains in the British Isles
List of Furth mountains in the British Isles
List of Marilyns in the British Isles
List of Hewitt mountains in England, Wales and Ireland

Notes

References

Bibliography

External links
MountainViews: The Irish Mountain Website, Galtymore
The Database of British and Irish Hills , the largest database of British Isles mountains ("DoBIH")
Ordnance Survey Ireland ("OSI") Online Map Viewer

Marilyns of Ireland
Hewitts of Ireland
Mountains and hills of County Limerick
Mountains and hills of County Tipperary
Highest points of Irish counties
Furths
Mountains under 1000 metres